Sparkes is a surname. Notable people with the surname include:

Ali Sparkes (born 1966), British children's author
Allan Sparkes (born 1958), Australian policeman, recipient of the Cross of Valour
Andrew Sparkes (born 1959), British ambassador to Nepal
Bernie Sparkes (born 1940), Canadian curler
Brian Sparkes (1941–2011), Canadian biochemist
George Sparkes (1845–1908), English cricketer
Gordon Sparkes, Canadian curler
Harold Sparkes (1896–1917), English footballer
Herbert Sparkes (1859–1923), British politician, MP for Tiverton
Irwin Sparkes, lead singer of English pop/rock band The Hoosiers
John Charles Lewis Sparkes (c.1833–1907), British art educator
John Sparkes (born 1954), Welsh comedian
Leonora Sparkes (1883–unknown), British opera singer
Lindsay Sparkes (nee Lindsay Davie) (born 1950), Canadian curler
Reginald F. Sparkes (1906–1990), Canadian educator, author and politician
Sir Robert Sparkes (1929–2006), Australian politician
Sydney Sparkes Orr, Professor of Philosophy at the University of Tasmania

See also
 
 
 Sparke
 Spark (disambiguation)